Botswana Unified Revenue Service (BURS) is the revenue service and a government agency of the Botswana government. Botswana Unified Revenue Service is responsible for collecting taxes and administering the Botswana Unified Revenue Service Act. The duties of the Botswana Unified Revenue Service include providing tax assistance to taxpayers and pursuing and resolving instances of erroneous or fraudulent tax filings.

Revenue collection 
Botswana Unified Revenue Service is responsible for assessing, collecting and accounting for revenue through the Ministry of Finance and Economic Development as specified by the Botswana Unified Revenue Service Act. The revenues and taxes administered by Botswana Unified Revenue Service include;

See also 

 Companies and Intellectual Property Authority
 Zimbabwe Revenue Authority

References

External links 

 

Tax terms
Revenue services
Government agencies of Botswana